Diaphus pallidus is a species of lanternfish found in the Western Indian Ocean.

References

Myctophidae
Taxa named by Jakob Gjøsæter
Fish described in 1989